Anguina graminis, the fescue leaf gall nematode, is a plant pathogenic nematode.

References 

Agricultural pest nematodes
Tylenchida